The 2014 Rally de Portugal was the fourth round of the 2014 World Rally Championship season. The event was based in Faro, Portugal, and started on 3 April and finished on 6 April after sixteen special stages, totaling 339.5 competitive kilometres, including a street stage in Lisbon on 3 April.

WRC Champion Sébastien Ogier won the Rally de Portugal for the fourth time, taking his third victory of the 2014 season.

Entry list

Report

Before the rally
The rally was preceded by the "Fafe Rally Sprint", a single-stage exhibition event run over the famous Fafe stages in the country's north which was won by Volkswagen driver Sebastien Ogier.

During the rally
WRC leader Sébastien Ogier was the first on the road in the first leg, but his disadvantage was decreased since in the days before the rally it rained, and the Algarve roads were a combination of dry and a little moist tracks, which led to difficulties for drivers to choose the right tire compound.
Sébastien Ogier led the rally since Lisbon SSS until the last stage of the first leg (SS7), finishing behind Mikko Hirvonen (1st) and Ott Tänak. In the middle Dani Sordo was in the lead after winning SS2 and SS3 with his Hyundai i20 WRC.
In the 2nd leg Sébastien Ogier imposed a demonic pace retaking the lead and quickly pulled away from a powerless Mikko Hirvonen. Mads Østberg finished in the podium last place. Dani Sordo after a promising start, retired at the beginning of the last day (due to mechanical when he was heading do start SS14) when he was in overall fourth place.
This rally was marked by the high number of crashes between the top drivers: Jari-Matti Latvala, Kris Meeke, Elfyn Evans and Robert Kubica (who would crash again in 2nd leg).

Results

Event standings

Special stages

Power Stage
The "Power stage" was a  stage at the end of the rally.

Standings after the rally

WRC

Drivers' Championship standings

Manufacturers' Championship standings

Other

WRC2 Drivers' Championship standings

WRC3 Drivers' Championship standings

Junior WRC Drivers' Championship standings

References

Results – juwra.com/World Rally Archive
Results – ewrc-results.com

Portugal
Rally de Portugal
Rally de Portugal